Global-View.com is an online currency trading community founded by former Continental Grain subsidiary, ContiCurrency, traders Jay Meisler and John Bland in 1996.  The historical significance of the website's main feature, the FOREX Forum, is that it started an important internet movement for retail trading.  It is said to be traveled both openly and through alias by some of the greatest living minds in foreign exchange.

Its early constituency consisted primarily of institutional bank traders, but it quickly discovered a fledgling FOREX trading world of retail speculators, fund managers, and former bank traders.  This timing brought the early internet start-up financial viability as a premier advertising space for online retail trading companies.  It received recognition on CNBC in March 1998, and its founders are quoted in Reuters, Forbes, The New York Times, and The Wall Street Journal.  It is the main topic of the Wiley publication, Forex Essentials in 15 Trades. Its market has since matured into a field of countless competitors, but it remains a market presence to date.

References

Foreign exchange market